Alissa Jung (born 30 June 1981) is a German actress and physician.

Early life 
Alissa Jung was born in Münster to Juliane Kirchner and Burkhard Jung (SPD), the Lord Mayor of Leipzig (Saxony) since 2006. She is the eldest of four sisters, and has a paternal half-sister.

Career 
From 1992 to 1999 she was a member of the listening play for children's radio ensemble of MDR and worked as a voice actor, dubbing and synchronizing various children's films and series. In 1996, she began to perform in plays (among others, in Theaterhaus Schille as the titular character inAntigone and in Schauspiel Leipzig in Jeff Noon's Yellow). At the age of 16, she was discovered during a theatrical performance and in 1998 she took her first film role in the ARD series In aller Freundschaft. Since then, she has appeared in many film and television productions.

She played the lead role of Nelly Heldmann in the 2006 Sat.1 telenovela Schmetterlinge im Bauch, the fairy tale adaptation Des Kaisers neue Kleider, and the Sat.1 film Im Brautkleid meiner Schwester. She portrayed the titular character, Mary of Nazareth, in the 2012 television film Ihr Name war Maria, and had lead roles in the movies Zweisitzrakete (2013) and Open my Eyes (2016).

In 2019, Jung starred in the critically acclaimed television program Das kleine Fernsehspiel, and the film Das Menschenmögliche.

Personal life 
Jung lived with her partner, television presenter Jan Hahn, and their children Lenius (born 1999) and Julina (born 2004) in Berlin, until their relationship ended in autumn 2006.

She resides in Berlin with her husband, actor Luca Marinelli. They met on the set of Mary of Nazreth.

In 2017, she received her doctorate of medicine. Her dissertation was titled Zinc deficiency is associated with depressive symptoms: results from the Berlin Aging Study II.

Philanthropy 
Jung initiated the "Schools for Haiti" campaign in 2008, which she has chaired since 2011 as chairwoman of the "Pen Paper Peace" association. The association is committed to education in Central America and Europe. Among other things, it finances two schools in Port-au-Prince, Haiti and, through educational projects, heightens the global sense of responsibility among young people in Germany and Italy.

Filmography 

 1998–2005: In aller Freundschaft (63 episodes)
 2000: Küss mich, Frosch (TV film)
 2001: Besuch aus Bangkok (TV film)
 2002–2003: Körner und Köter (9 episodes)
 2003: Cologne P.D. – Blutige Beichte
 2004: Leipzig Homicide – Sein letztes Date
 2004: Hallo Robbie! – Flaschenpost
 2004: Die Wache – Schein und Sein 
 2005: Die Rettungsflieger – Trennung
 2006: Der erste Engel
 2006–2007: Schmetterlinge im Bauch (123 episodes)
 2007:  (TV film)
 2007: Stolberg – Der Sonnenkönig
 2007: SOKO Wismar – Spitzenleistung
 2008: Im Tal der wilden Rosen – Fluss der Liebe
 2008: Inga Lindström – Hochzeit in Hardingsholm
 2008: Griechische Küsse (TV film)
 2008: Alarm für Cobra 11 – Die Autobahnpolizei – Leben und leben lassen
 2009: Küstenwache – Grausame Täuschung
 2010: Cologne P.D. – Entführt
 2010: Tatort – Der Polizistinnenmörder
 2010: Schafe zählen
 2010: Rosamunde Pilcher – Wenn das Herz zerbricht
 2010: Des Kaisers neue Kleider (TV film)
 2011: Im Brautkleid meiner Schwester (TV film)
 2012: Mary of Nazareth (2 parts)
 2012: Open my Eyes
 2012: Zweisitzrakete
 2013: Heiter bis tödlich: Morden im Norden – Auf Herz und Nieren
 2014: Die Familiendetektivin – Brüderchen und Schwesterchen
 2014: Alarm für Cobra 11 – Die Autobahnpolizei – Lackschäden
 2014: Die Bergretter – Gefangen im Eis
 2015: Bettys Diagnose – Fieber
 2015: SOKO München – Die Kinder der Agathe S.
 2015: Einfach Rosa – Die Hochzeitsplanerin (TV series)
 2016: Inga Lindström – Gretas Hochzeit
 2019: Das Menschenmögliche (TV film) 
 2022: Der Überfall (TV miniseries)

References

External links 
 
 Online-Demoband of Jung (with Flash or other Mediaplayer)
 Schulen für Haiti
 Pen Paper Peace

Living people
1981 births
German film actresses
20th-century German actresses
21st-century German actresses